Ram Naik (born 16 April 1934) is a veteran Indian politician from the Bharatiya Janata Party, served as the 19th Governor of Uttar Pradesh.

Political career
Ram Naik was a member of the 13th Lok Sabha and was Minister of Oil and Natural Gas in the Atal Bihari Vajpayee cabinet (1999–2004).
He was instrumental in introducing Members of Parliament Local Area Development Scheme. 
He was the BJP candidate for elections to the 14th Lok Sabha representing Mumbai North, but lost to famous Bollywood actor Govinda, an INC candidate from Virar.

A Rashtriya Swayamsevak Sangh volunteer since childhood, he holds a law degree. He started his political career with the Bharatiya Jana Sangh in 1964 and was involved in organizing a group of rail commuters in Mumbai. He represented Borivali in the state assembly in 1978 and was re-elected twice, before becoming Minister of State for Railways in 1998, when he was influential in forming the Mumbai Railway Vikas Corporation.

In 2004 he published a statement in which he demanded apology from the Prime Minister Manmohan Singh and chairwoman Sonia Gandhi for removal of quotes from statues dedicated to the Indian revolutionaries, such as Subhas Chandra Bose, Madan Lal Dhingra, Vinayak Damodar Savarkar, Bhagat Singh, and Bahadur Shah Zafar.

Ram Naik announced in September 2013 that he will not contest the 2014 Lok Sabha Polls. On 14 July 2014 he was named as the Governor of Uttar Pradesh.

Within a few months of his being appointed governor, he stated that "The Ram Temple should be built as soon as possible, this is what the people of this country want and their wishes should be fulfilled." The theme was immediately backed up by Hindutva groups.

Subsequently, his Hindutva remarks seem to have been reined in by Narendra Modi.

Personal life
He was born in Sangli district of Maharashtra state. He married Kunda Naik on 17 May 1960 and has two daughters.

Positions held
1969–1977 – Organising Secretary, Bharatiya Jan Sangh, Mumbai
1977–1978 – General Secretary, Janata Party, Mumbai
1978–1989 – Member, Legislative Assembly of Maharashtra (3 terms)
1979–1980 – President, Janata Party, Mumbai
1980–1986 – President, BJP, Mumbai
1986–1989 – Vice President, BJP, Maharashtra
1989 – Elected to 9th Lok Sabha
1991 – Elected to 10th Lok Sabha
1999 – Elected to 13th Lok Sabha
1999–2004 – Union Cabinet Minister, Petroleum and Natural Gas
since 2004 – President, All India Disciplinary Committee of BJP
 2014–2019 Governor of Uttar Pradesh

References

|-

|-

|-

External links

Official biographical sketch in Parliament of India website
Official Website
Official Website of Governor House Uttar Pradesh

Bharatiya Janata Party politicians from Maharashtra
1934 births
Living people
Lok Sabha members from Maharashtra
India MPs 1989–1991
India MPs 1991–1996
India MPs 1996–1997
India MPs 1998–1999
India MPs 1999–2004
People from Sangli district
Marathi politicians
Politicians from Mumbai
Bharatiya Jana Sangh politicians
Governors of Uttar Pradesh
Governors of Rajasthan
Maharashtra MLAs 1985–1990
Petroleum and Natural Gas Ministers of India